Durgapur is a village in Rahata taluka of Ahmednagar district in the Indian state of Maharashtra. It is located in southern part of Rahata taluka.

Population
As of 2011 census, Population of village is 2641, of which 1384 are males and 1257 are females.

Transport

Road
Durgapur is connected to nearby villages Hasnapur, Dadh Bk. and Chinchpur by village roads.

Rail
Shrirampur (Belapur) Railway Station is nearest railway station to a village.

Air
Shirdi Airport is the nearest airport to a village.

See also
List of villages in Rahata taluka

References 

Villages in Ahmednagar district